Țînțăreni is a commune in the Anenii Noi District of Moldova. It is composed of two villages, Crețoaia and Țînțăreni.

First mention of the village was in 1659 (named Luțeni).

References

Communes of Anenii Noi District